The Honțiș is a right tributary of the river Sighișoara in Romania. It flows into the Sighișoara in Honțișor.

References

Rivers of Romania
Rivers of Arad County